Derrybrusk is a civil parish and townland (of 204 acres) in County Fermanagh, Northern Ireland. The civil parish is mainly situated in the historic barony of Tirkennedy with a small portion (the two townlands of Aghnacarra and Gola) in the barony of Magherastephana. Derrybrusk townland is in the portion of the parish of the same name in Tirkennedy.

Civil parish of Derrybrusk
The civil parish includes the village of Carrybridge.

Townlands
The civil parish includes the following townlands:

A
Aghnacarra

B
Ballyreagh, Bonnybrook

C
Cappy, Coolnashanton

D
Derrybrusk, Drumcrow, Drumcullion, Drumrainy

F
Fyagh

G
Glasdrumman, Glasmullagh, Gola

K
Killygrania, Killyreagh, Kilnamaddy, Kilsallagh

L
Largy

R
Ring

T
Tawnyreagh, Thomastown, Tullyharney

W
Whinnigan Glebe

See also 
List of townlands in County Fermanagh
List of civil parishes of County Fermanagh

References

Townlands of County Fermanagh